Cabela's Survival: Shadows of Katmai is an action-adventure video game developed by Fun Labs and published by Activision for the PlayStation 3, Xbox 360 and Wii.

Reception 
For the Xbox 360 version, Official Xbox Magazine gave it a 5/10, startled "the game can easily be finished in an afternoon, leaving hunting fans wondering why they wasted it playing a lackluster action-adventure game." Destructoid gave it 4.5/10 as "The one thing that it so desperately needs -- entertainment value -- is sorely lacking in areas where it shouldn't, ultimately dragging the title down to the pit of forgotten titles."

For the PlayStation 3 version, PlayStation Official Magazine UK gave it a 6/10, saying "The whole package is, of course, fugly and cheap. But whether it's surprisingly enjoyable dogsledding sections or physics gaffes that often see dead animals inadvertently do the splits, I had a smile on my face throughout." And Push Square gave it a 4/10, as what it said "Shadows of Katmai looked to be an exciting new entry in the Cabela's franchise, but it instead finds itself trekking directly into uncharted territory without the necessary finesse and polish it needs to withstand its high profile competition – a far cry from the niche genre the Cabela's series is known and enjoyed for."

References 

2011 video games
Activision games
Cabela's video games
PlayStation 3 games
Video games developed in Romania
Wii games
Xbox 360 games
Action-adventure games
Fun Labs games
Single-player video games